S21sec was founded as the first iberian cybersecurity company in 2000. During these years, cybercrime has evolved at a breathtaking pace into an organised, sophisticated, criminal front that affects individuals and organizations globally. In late 2014, Portugal-based Sonae bought S21sec. In 2008 S21sec created the eCrime & Counter Threat Intelligence Department. SONAE IM acquired Nextel S.A. in 2018 and merged it with S21sec, creating the biggest Iberian company of Cybersecurity Services.

The company offers the complete breed of services that are needed to go alongside the digital transformation processes that are reshaping businesses, adapting and evolving their service portfolio to cover the complete NIST framework (National Institute of Standards and Technology of the United States) globally used as a reference on how enterprises should manage their cybersecurity. Therefore, S21sec covers the phases of identification, protection, detection, response, and recover.

See also

References

External links

Computer security software companies
Computer security companies
Basque companies
Software companies of Spain
Technology companies established in 2002
Spanish brands